Ahmet Karadayi (born 19 January 1996) is a Belgian professional footballer who plays as a midfielder for Turkish club Nazilli Belediyespor.

Professional career
Born in Belgium and of Turkish descent, while his mother got Kurdish roots too. Karadayi begun playing football at his local club Weerstand Koersel at the age of 7, and worked his way to Sporting Hasselt in the 4th division in Belgium. He moved up a division, joining Geel  in 2016.

Karadayi moved from AS Geel in the Belgian First Amateur Division to Kardemir Karabükspor in the Süper Lig on 16 January 2018, after a couple successful seasons. Karadayi made his professional debut for Kardemir Karabükspor in a 4–0 Süper Lig loss to Osmanlıspor on 16 March 2018.

References

External links
 
 
 

1996 births
People from Heusden-Zolder
Footballers from Limburg (Belgium)
Belgian people of Turkish descent
Living people
Belgian footballers
Association football midfielders
Sporting Hasselt players
A.S. Verbroedering Geel players
Kardemir Karabükspor footballers
Nazilli Belediyespor footballers
Belgian National Division 1 players
Süper Lig players
TFF First League players
TFF Second League players
Belgian expatriate footballers
Expatriate footballers in Turkey
Belgian expatriate sportspeople in Turkey